Pablo Cuevas was the two-time defending champion and successfully defended his title, defeating Albert Ramos Viñolas in the final, 6–7(3–7), 6–4, 6–4.

Seeds
The top four seeds receive a bye into the second round.

Draw

Finals

Top half

Bottom half

Qualifying

Seeds

Qualifiers

Qualifying draw

First qualifier

Second qualifier

Third qualifier

Fourth qualifier

References
 Main draw
 Qualifying draw

Singles